Gaynor Macfarlane is a theatre and radio drama director, and producer for BBC Radio Drama at Pacific Quay, Glasgow.

Career
Macfarlane directed the first, second, fourth, sixth, seventh, eighth and eleventh radio series of The No. 1 Ladies' Detective Agency.

In the theatre, Macfarlane has directed Wit by Margaret Edson, Folie à Trois by Sarah Wooley and The Past is not a Place by Beatrice Colin for the Stellar Quines Theatre Company; The Birds by Aristophanes and After the Rain by Sergi Belbel at the Gate Theatre; The House of Desires by Sor Juana Inés de la Cruz and Burdalane by Judith Adams at the Battersea Arts Centre; Damon and Pythias at the Globe and Helen at the RNT Studio. She has been Literary Manager of the Gate Theatre, Script Advisor at the National Theatre and Dramaturg at the Globe during its first season. She has translated plays for the Almeida and Chichester Festival Theatre.

Radio plays

Sources:

 Gaynor Macfarlane's radio play listing at RadioListings website

Theatre

References

BBC Radio drama directors
BBC radio producers
British theatre directors
Living people
Scottish theatre directors
Year of birth missing (living people)
Women radio producers